Haveli Lakha (Punjabi,) is a city in Depalpur Tehsil of Okara District in the Punjab province of Pakistan. It is located around 158 km (98.4 miles) south west of Lahore.

Haveli Lakha is part of Depalpur Tehsil and is administratively subdivided into three Union councils.

See also
Muhammad Yar Chishti

References

Cities and towns in Okara District